

Kaytagsky District (Xaydaqlı yaq) is an administrative and municipal district (raion), one of the forty-one in the Republic of Dagestan, Russia. It is located in the southeast of the republic. Its administrative center is the rural locality (a selo) of Madzhalis. As of the 2010 Census, the total population of the district was 31,368, with the population of Madzhalis accounting for 21.7% of that number.

Administrative and municipal status
Within the framework of administrative divisions, Kaytagsky District is one of the forty-one in the Republic of Dagestan. The district is divided into twelve selsoviets which comprise forty-five rural localities. As a municipal division, the district is incorporated as Kaytagsky Municipal District. Its twelve selsoviets are incorporated as sixteen rural settlements within the municipal district. The selo of Madzhalis serves as the administrative center of both the administrative and municipal district.

Former state
Around 1800, Kaitag or Karakaitag was a small ethnically Dargin state. Its chief town was Bashli (probably Bashlykent) and its ruler was called the Utsmi.

See also 
 Kaitag textiles
 Kaitak language

References

Notes

Sources

Districts of Dagestan